Karpov is a rural locality (a khutor) in Eltonskoye Rural Settlement, Pallasovsky District, Volgograd Oblast, Russia. The population was 117 as of 2010. There are 3 streets.

Geography 
Karpov is located 13 km from Elton, 105 km south of Pallasovka (the district's administrative centre) by road. Vengelovka is the nearest rural locality.

References 

Rural localities in Pallasovsky District